Odder station is a railway station serving the town of Odder, Denmark.

The station is the southern terminus of the Odder Line from Aarhus to Odder. The station opened in 1884 with the opening of the Hads-Ning Herreders Jernbane from Aarhus to Hov. Since 2016, the station has been temporarily closed along with the Odder Line while it's being reconstructed to form part of the Aarhus light rail system.

History 

The station opened on 19 June 1884 as the railway company Hads-Ning Herreders Jernbane (HHJ) opened a railway line from Aarhus to Hov. In 1904, Odder station also became the eastern terminus of the new Horsens-Odder railway line, which connected Odder with Horsens.

The Horsens-Odder Line closed in 1967, whereas the section of the Odder Line from Odder to Hov was closed in 1977 and Odder station became the southern terminus of the Odder Line. In 2016, the station was temporarily closed along with the Odder Line while it's being reconstructed to form part of the Aarhus light rail system, scheduled to open in 2017.

References

External links

 Banedanmark
 DSB

Buildings and structures in Odder Municipality
Railway stations opened in 1884
Railway stations in the Central Denmark Region
Railway stations in Denmark opened in the 19th century